Camberwell Football Club was an Australian rules football club which formed around the mid-1880s, with a published match in 1886 and competed in the Victorian Football Association (VFA) between 1926 and 1990. Nicknamed the Cobras, Camberwell wore blue, white and red club colours. They were based in the Melbourne suburb of Camberwell.

History
Camberwell FC competed in the Victorian Junior Football Association in 1888, finishing sixth on the ladder, 8th in 1890 and 8th in 1891. At the 1895 VJFA – AGM, the competition was reduced from 20 teams to 12 teams and Camberwell was one of the clubs that was not admitted and it appears that Camberwell FC went into recess for a number of years, before joining the Eastern Suburbs Football Association in 1899.  In 1912, Camberwell went into recess with their players being distributed to the Burwood and Kew Football Clubs.  In 1913 Camberwell were admitted into the Victorian Junior Football Association, rated by many as the third highest grade of football in Victoria at that time

It seems a Camberwell Football Club was playing at Camberwell Junction (the corner of Burke and Riversdale Roads) as early as 1886. The space that became the home of the Camberwell Football Club for eighty years (eventually known as 'Camberwell Sports Ground') was originally a vegetable garden ('Brooks Paddock') and part of Camberwell Racecourse. The preparation of a new sports ground (originally dubbed 'Bowen Park') on this site was finished in 1909 and Camberwell Football Club first played at the new ground the following year (1910). A grandstand for visitors' rooms (the 'Tramways Grandstand') was built in 1920. A much larger spectators' grandstand and pavilion was built in 1935 – and ready for the 1936 football season.

After establishing itself as a successful junior and sub-district club, Camberwell was seen by the 1920s as a likely strong fit for expansions into the eastern suburbs of either the Victorian Football League or the Victorian Football Association. It lodged applications to join both at different times during the early 1920s, and was admitted to the VFA for the 1926 season. It reached its first Grand Final in 1935, losing by nine points to Yarraville.

With the introduction of throw-pass football to the VFA in 1938, the club made one of the VFA's most significant ever recruiting coups when it recruited champion VFL player Laurie Nash for a huge salary of £8/wk. Following World War II, Camberwell won its first and only top division minor premiership in 1946, but lost in the Grand Final against Sandringham by seven points.

Following the end of the throw-pass era in 1950, Camberwell became one of several weaker VFA clubs who struggled throughout the 1950s. The club was operating as amateur in 1953 due to lack of funds, and it faced pressure to hold its lease at the Camberwell Sports Ground from local soccer clubs who could offer the council more money. It was generally near the bottom of the ladder, and found itself in Division 2 when the Association was partitioned in 1961. The club remained weak throughout the 1960s.

The club improved through the early 1970s, and became a regular Division 2 finalist from 1973. The club played in losing Grand Finals in 1975 against Brunswick and in 1978 against Frankston, before winning its first premiership in 1979, defeating Oakleigh by 38 points. Promoted to Division 1 for the first time, the club was relegated after one season, but won the Division 2 premiership again in 1981, defeating Waverley by 32 points in the Grand Final. In the next few years, Camberwell was considered one of the boom clubs of the VFA, and in 1984 it reached the Division 1 finals for the first time since the 1940s.

Camberwell's position deteriorated abruptly in 1985. Struggling financially, as many VFA clubs were, it asked its players to take a pay cut at the start of the season; but, still unable to make its player payments, senior players began to walk out on the club at midseason. Within a year, there had been an exodus of more than forty players, plus the club was left with a large damage bill after a grandstand fire. The inexperienced team which remained was winless with a percentage of only 30.1 in 1986, including suffering a VFA-record loss against Williamstown by 315 points, and was relegated. The club was more competitive in Division 2, but endured two consecutive winless seasons after the competition was recombined into a single division in 1989. After pre-season form indicated the club would be even less competitive in 1991, the club dropped out of the VFA a couple of weeks prior to the start of the season.

The club hoped to regroup and rejoin the VFA in 1992, but this did not eventuate. The club joined the Victorian Amateur Football Association (VAFA) as Camberwell Amateurs in 1992, and permanently folded in the summer of 1995, with the 1994 VAFA season being the last competitive competition that the club would ever participate in.

Over the course of their sixty-two season involvement in the VFA, the Cobras/Tricolours achieved a success rate of 40.9%.

Football Competition Timeline
 (1889–1894) – Victorian Junior Football Association
 (1895) – Club in recess
 (1896–1898) – Camberwell Juniors active, but not playing in a formal competition
 (1899–1904) – Eastern Suburbs Football Association
 (1905–1911) – Reporter Football Association
 (1912) – club was in recess
 (1913–1914) – Victorian Junior Football Association
 (1915) – In recess ?
 (1916–1919) – Victorian Junior Football Association
 (1920–1925) – Melbourne District Football Association
 (1926–1941) – Victorian Football Association
 (1942–1944) – VFA in recess due to World War II
 (1945–1960) – Victorian Football Association
 (1961–1979) – Victorian Football Association: Division Two. In 1961, the VFA was partitioned into two divisions.
 (1980) – Victorian Football Association: Division One
 (1981) – Victorian Football Association: Division Two
 (1982–1986) – Victorian Football Association: Division One
 (1987–1988) – Victorian Football Association: Division Two
 (1989–1990) – Victorian Football Association: In 1989, the VFA recombined to a single division.
 (1991) – Club in recess
 (1992) – Victorian Amateur Football Association: G Section North
 (1993) – Victorian Amateur Football Association: F2 Section
 (1994) – Victorian Amateur Football Association: G Section North

Premierships
Eastern Suburbs Football Association
1899: Camberwell: 2.6 – 18 defeated Albion: 1.2 – 8
Reporter District Football Association
1907
1908
1909
1911 – A. Section: Camberwell: 14.15 – 99 defeated Burwood: 2.9 – 21
Melbourne District Football Association
1921 – Camberwell defeated Brunswick Junior by 10 points
1922 – Camberwell: 8.9 – 57 defeated Moreland: 7.9 – 51
1923 – Camberwell: 9.12 – 66 defeated Fairfield: 8.8 – 56

Camberwell's 1923 MDFA premiership team that triumphed on the MCG:
Backs:	Harley,	Killen,	Amery
Half backs: Whitecross,	Syd Reeves, Alway
Centres: Birchall,	Hardie,	Price
Half forwards: Gil Hendrie,	Aisbett,	  Carswell
Forwards: Smith, Reg Whitehead,	  Bill Yole
Followers: Wal Tuck, Dimond, Les Woodford

Victorian Football Association
 1979 – Second Division
 Camberwell: 18.13 – 121 defeated Oakleigh: 12.11 – 83.

Grand Final Side
B:	Rob McFee	Greg Spithill	Mick Alexeeff
HB:	Greg Cook	Ross Wright	Colin Judd
C:		Neil Chamberlain	
HF:	Peter Slacik	Peter Oliver	Andy Moore
F:	Scott Cowley	Gary Hammond	Geoff Simpson
Foll:	Phil Neilson	Mark Davidson	Peter Hirst
Interchange:	Kerry Haywood	Steve Teakel	
Coach – Graeme Phillips; Assistant Coach – Gordon Duff; Captain – Peter Oliver; Vice-Captain – Neil Chamberlain.
 1981 – Second Division
 Camberwell: 15.16 – 106 defeated Waverley: 11.8 – 74.

Grand Final side
B: Rob McFee Roy Cahill Greg Spithill
HB: Colin Judd Ross Wright Mark Hipworth
C: Neil Chamberlain
HF: Drew Pevitt Gary Hammond Leon Rice
F: Peter Oliver Peter Stevenson Peter Howard
Foll: Phil Neilson Mark Davidson Peter Hirst
 Interchange: Greg Cook Steve Teakel
 Coach: Leon Rice

VFA Club Records

 Most goals in a season: 141 - Laurie Nash in 1941
 Most Consecutive games in a row: Harry Jones - 133

Victorian Football Association – Best & Fairest Honours
 J. J. Liston Trophy winners
1950 – Frank Stubbs 
1957 – Ken Ross
J. Field Medal winner 
1971 – Rodney Evans

Team of the Century
CAMBERWELL FOOTBALL CLUB
Backline: Colin Judd, Jim Bohan, Ken Ross 
Half Back: Geoff Mason, Harry Jones, Marcus Boyall
Centre: Reg Horkings, Lloyd Holyoak, Charlie Clamp
Half Forward: Ian Whitten, Laurie Nash, Roy Williams.
Forward: Bill Luff, Garry Hammond, Geoff Simpson
Followers: Frank Stubbs, Godon Duff, R.J. 'Nipper' Bradford
Interchange: Brendan Budge, Mark Davidson, Peter Oliver, Peter Stevenson, George Stone, Ross Wright
Coach: A 'Horrie' Mason
Captain Jim Bohan
Vice Captain Colin Judd

VFL / AFL Players
The following footballers, played with Camberwell prior to making their VFL / AFL debut, with the year indicating their VFL / AFL debut.

 1911 – Ben Main: South Melbourne
 1915 – Bill Amery: Richmond
 1919 – Harry Weatherill: Richmond
 1922 – Doug Hayes: Richmond
 1925 – Gil Hendrie: Hawthorn
 1925 – Reg Whitehead: Hawthorn
 1925 – Les Woodford: Hawthorn
 1926 – Alby Millard: Hawthorn
 1928 – Wally Lathlain: Hawthorn
 1928 – Keith Parris: Essendon
 1929 - Richard Greenwood: Footscray
 1930 - Leon Bazin: Footscray
 1930 – George Bennett: Hawthorn
 1930 – Roy Williams: Footscray
 1932 – Les Harvey: Collingwood
 1934 – Alec Fyfe: Collingwood 
 1934 – Bill Luff: Essendon
 1934 – Len Wallace: Essendon
 1935 – Clarrie Shields: Footscray
 1935 – Vin Smith: Hawthorn
 1935 – Ray Wartman: Melbourne

 1937 – Tommy Laskey: Fitzroy
 1939 – Arthur Davidson: Hawthorn
 1940 – Jack Bennett: Carlton
 1940 – Jack Kenny: North Melbourne
 1941 – George Lenne: Melbourne
 1941 – Albert Prior: Hawthorn
 1942 – Frank Anderson: North Melbourne
 1942 – Bob Austen: Hawthorn
 1942 – Barney Jorgensen: Hawthorn
 1943 – Don Wilks: Hawthorn
 1944 – Tom Spear: Hawthorn
 1946 – Ken Munro: Hawthorn
 1946 – Billy Winward: St. Kilda
 1951 – Jack MacDonald: Hawthorn
 1959 – Brian Coleman: Hawthorn
 1959 – Peter Rice: South Melbourne
 1978 – Terry Wallace: Hawthorn
 1990 – Dean Greig: St.Kilda
 1991 – Darron Wilkinson: Fitzroy

VFL / AFL footballers came to play / coach at the Camberwell FC
The following footballers came to play & / or coach with Camberwell FC, with senior football experience from an VFL / AFL club. The year indicates their first season at Camberwell FC.

 1909 – Reuben Holland South Melbourne
 1919 – Jim Cowell: St.Kilda
 1921 – Clarrie Calwell – Carlton
 1921 – Reg Hede: Richmond
 1922 – Reg Whitehead: Richmond
 1923? – George Robbins: St. Kilda
 1926 – Dave Elliman: Melbourne
 1926 – Lew Gough: Hawthorn
 1926 - Harry Harrison: Essendon
 1926 – George Rawle: Essendon
 1926 – W. H. Billy Stone Carlton
 1926 – Jack Vale: Carlton
 1927 – Jack Boothman: Hawthorn
 1927 – Carl Watson: Richmond
 1927 – Bert Calwell: Hawthorn
 1928 – Harry Brown: St. Kilda
 1928 – Wally Gunnyon: St. Kilda
 1928 – Harry Lakin: St. Kilda
 1929 – Ted Brewis: Carlton
 1929 – Jim Shanahan: Collingwood
 1930 - George Bayliss: Richmond
 1930 – Ron Black: Hawthorn
 1930 – Frank Whitty: Hawthorn
 1930? - Eric Poole: South Melbourne
 1930 - Percy Wilson: Collingwood
 1932?- Alex Clarke: North Melbourne
 1932 – Horrie Mason: St.Kilda
 1934 – Maurie Hunter: Richmond
 1934 - Clive McCorkell: Essendon
 1934 - Joe Meehan: South Melbourne
 1934 – Dick O'Shea: North Melbourne

 1934 - Charlie Stanbridge - South Melbourne
 1934 - Johnny Walker: Essendon
 1934 - Carl Watson: Richmond
 1934 – Albert "Jack" Williamson: Carlton
 1936 – Jack Kidd: Essendon
 1936 - Roy Selleck: South Melbourne
 1936 – Clete Turner: Geelong
 1937 – Roy Laing: Essendon
 1938 – Terry Brain: South Melbourne
 1938 – Frank Finn: Carlton
 1938 – Laurie Nash: South Melbourne
 1939 – Dick Abikhair: Hawthorn
 1939 – Monty Brown: Carlton
 1939 – Pat Farrelly: Carlton
 1939 – Alan Fitcher: Fitzroy
 1939 – Viv Randall: Hawthorn
 1939 – Ted Pool: Hawthorn
 1939 – Joe Rogers: North Melbourne
 1939 – Jim Toohey Junior: Fitzroy
 1940 – Bernie O'Brien: Footscray
 1941 – Roy Cazaly: St. Kilda
 1941 – Stan Spinks: Hawthorn
 1941 – Laurie Taylor: South Melbourne
 1945 – Jim Bradford: Collingwood
 1945 – Albert Collier: Collingwood
 1945 - Ken Dineen: South Melbourne
 1945 – Allan Jensen: Hawthorn
 1946 - Alf Benison: South Melbourne
 1946 - Dal Kennedy: Footscray
 1946 – Ivor McIvor: Essendon
 1947 – Marcus Boyall: Collingwood
 1947 – Jim Bohan: Hawthorn

 1948 – Ken Ross – Fitzroy
 1949 - Bob Milgate - Hawthorn
 1950 – Cec Ruddell: Essendon 
 1951 – Jack Headley: North Melbourne
 1952 - Bob Bradley: Essendon
 1952 – Alan Thynne: Carlton
 1953 – Dick Harris: Richmond
 1953 - Keith McGuinness: South Melbourne
 1953 – Oscar Skalberg: North Melbourne
 1954 – Ted Jarrard: North Melbourne
 1955 – Ken McKaige: Melbourne
 1955 – Vin Sabbatucci: St. Kilda
 1958 – Peter Box: Footscray
 1959 – Terry Mountain: Geelong
 1967 – Mike Delanty: Collingwood
 1967 – Bill Serong: Collingwood
 1970 – Peter Brenchley: Melbourne
 1974 – Colin Judd: Hawthorn
 1977 – Neil Chamberlain: Melbourne
 1977 – Ray Smith: Essendon
 1978 – Ross Wright: Essendon
 1979 – Kerry Haywood: North Melbourne
 1980 – Rino Pretto: Fitzroy
 1980 – Leon Rice: Hawthorn
 1982 – Mordy Bromberg: St. Kilda
 1982 – Robert Wilkinson: Hawthorn
 1984 – Graeme Schultz: Essendon
 1984 – Mark Turner: Hawthorn
 1987 – John Frazer: North Melbourne
 1987 – Sam Kekovich: North Melbourne
 1988 – Rene Kink: Collingwood
 1989 – David Sullivan: Essendon
 1990 – Gary Brice: South Melbourne

Club Honourboard:Senior Football

Note:

100 Game Club
The following footballers played 100 plus senior games for Camberwell FC in the VFA.

Greg Spithill: 163 
Gary Hammond: 162 
Ken Freiberg: 151 
Oscar Skalberg: 150 
Harry Jones: 143* 
Jim Bohan: 140 
Phil Neilson: 139
 
Colin Judd: 134 
Roy Williams: 133 
Bill Hazlett: 128 
Geoff Mason: 127
Geoff Simpson: 123 
Kevin Johnson: 116 
Gordon Duff: 114 

Jack Seelenmeyer: 113 
Charlie Clamp: 113 
Reg Fletcher: 113 
Ken Douglas: 112
Dennis Boyd: 112 
Mark Davidson: 110 
John Hook: 110 

Reg Horkings: 108 
Peter Fox: 106 
Bob Gibson: 106 
Keith McGuinness: 105 
John Smith: 105
Ern Dyball: 104 
Geoff Brayne: 103 
Ken Benbow: 101

 Harry Jones: Played his first 133 games in a row for Camberwell.

References

External links

 Fullpointsfooty
 Footypedia
 Boyles History of Camberwell FC. By Ken Mansell

The complete list of players can be viewed here too.
Former Victorian Football League clubs
Australian rules football clubs in Melbourne
1896 establishments in Australia
1995 disestablishments in Australia
Australian rules football clubs established in 1896
Australian rules football clubs disestablished in 1995
Sport in the City of Boroondara